Bijarkan or Bijar Kan may refer to:
 Bijarkan, Rezvanshahr
 Bijarkan, Sowme'eh Sara